Manitoba Books Awards/Les Prix du livre du Manitoba is the premiere annual book awards for Manitoba, Canada. Originating in 1988, an award gala is usually held in April in Winnipeg, Manitoba, celebrating the best of Manitoba writing and publishing from the previous year. 

Depending on the year, there are several awards conferred, as some of the awards are only bestowed biannually. The awards are co-produced by the Association of Manitoba Book Publishers and the Manitoba Writers' Guild. Awards include the Eileen McTavish Sykes Award for Best First Book, the Margaret Laurence Award for Fiction, the Carol Shields Award for best Winnipeg book, the Mary Scorer Award for Best Book by a Manitoba Publisher, the Alexander Kennedy Isbister Award for Non-Fiction, the McNally Robinson Book of the Year Award and others. Past winners include Miriam Toews, David Bergen, Joan Thomas, W.P. Kinsella, Carol Shields and others.

Winners

References

External links
Manitoba Book Awards, official website

Manitoba awards
Awards established in 1988
1988 establishments in Manitoba
First book awards
Canadian non-fiction literary awards
Canadian literary awards
Canadian poetry awards
Canadian fiction awards
Canadian children's literary awards
Literary awards honoring unpublished books or writers
Illustrated book awards
Publisher awards
Literary festivals in Manitoba
Culture of Winnipeg